Stanley Institute, also known as Rock School, is a historic African American school building located at Cambridge, Dorchester County, Maryland.  It is a rectangular one-story, gable-front frame building with a small entrance vestibule built about 1865. Three original blackboards still occupy their proper locations. The building was moved to its present location from a site near Church Creek in 1867. It served as both a church and a school until the erection of the present Rock Methodist Church later in the 19th century.

It was listed on the National Register of Historic Places in 1975.

References

External links

Photos and preservation information
, including photo from 2002, at Maryland Historical Trust

School buildings on the National Register of Historic Places in Maryland
Buildings and structures in Dorchester County, Maryland
Defunct schools in Maryland
School buildings completed in 1865
African-American history in Cambridge, Maryland
National Register of Historic Places in Dorchester County, Maryland
Relocated buildings and structures in Maryland